is a private junior college, located in the city of Akita, Japan.

History
Misono School was opened by the Missionary Sisters of the Sacred Heart in Akita City in 1940, and established a kindergarten teachers training school in 1957. It was officially chartered as a junior college in 1966. The school offers a curriculum for obtaining a teacher's certificate for nursery schools or kindergartens.

External links
 Official website 

Japanese junior colleges
Educational institutions established in 1966
Private universities and colleges in Japan
Universities and colleges in Akita Prefecture
1966 establishments in Japan
Catholic universities and colleges in Japan
Buildings and structures in Akita (city)